The following is a list of notable events and releases of the year 1947 in Norwegian music.

Events

 Edvard Fliflet Bræin made his debut as an orchestra conductor in Bergen.

Deaths
 May
 23 – Per Kvist, revue writer, entertainer, stage actor, film actor and children's writer (born 1890).

 June
 28 – Per Steenberg, organist and composer (born 1870).

Births

 January
 24 – Øystein Sunde, folk singer and guitarist.

 February
 9 – Ole Paus, folk singer and guitarist.
 15 – Wenche Myhre, singer and actress.
 19 – Øystein Dolmen, singer and songwriter, Knutsen & Ludvigsen.

 March
 4 – Jan Garbarek, jazz saxophonist and composer.
 29 – Aage Kvalbein, cellist and professor at the Norwegian Academy of Music.
 30 – Terje Venaas, jazz upright bassist.
 31 – Kjell Mørk Karlsen, composer and organist.

 April
 1 – Fred Nøddelund, jazz flugelhornist and band leader (died 2016).
 30 – Finn Kalvik, singer and songwriter.

 May
 1 – Gunnar Germeten Jr., composer (died 1999).
 9 – Pernille Anker, actor and singer (died 1999).

 June
 13 – Ketil Haugsand, harpsichordist and conductor.

 July
 3 – Grethe Kausland, singer, performer and actress (died 2007).

 August
 2 – Ruth Bakke, organist and composer.
 23 – Terje Rypdal, guitarist and composer.

 September
 25 – Torhild Staahlen, operatic mezzo-soprano at Norwegian National Opera.
 28 – Gustav Lorentzen, folk singer and entertainer in Knutsen & Ludvigsen (died 2010).

 December
 29 – Odd-Arne Jacobsen, guitarist and songwriter.

See also
 1947 in Norway
 Music of Norway

References

 
Norwegian music
Norwegian
Music
1940s in Norwegian music